Sham Chung Tsuen is a village in Shap Pat Heung, Yuen Long District, Hong Kong.

Administration
Sham Chung Tsuen is a recognized village under the New Territories Small House Policy.

See also
 Tin Liu Tsuen, a village adjacent to Sham Chung Tsuen, to its west

References

External links

 Delineation of area of existing village Sham Chung (Shap Pat Heung) for election of resident representative (2019 to 2022)

Villages in Yuen Long District, Hong Kong
Shap Pat Heung